Meghadūta ( literally Cloud Messenger) is a lyric poem written by Kālidāsa (c. 4th–5th century CE), considered to be one of the greatest Sanskrit poets. It describes how a yakṣa (or nature spirit), who had been banished by his master to a remote region for a year, asked a cloud to take a message of love to his wife. The poem became well-known in Sanskrit literature and inspired other poets to write similar poems (known as "messenger-poems", or Sandesha Kavya) on similar themes. Korada Ramachandra Sastri wrote Ghanavrttam, a sequel to Meghduta. By- Riyanshu Singh

About the poem
A poem of 120 stanzas, it is one of Kālidāsa's most famous works. The work is divided into two parts, Purva-megha and Uttara-megha. It recounts how a yakṣa, a subject of King Kubera (the god of wealth), after being exiled for a year to Central India for neglecting his duties, convinces a passing cloud to take a message to his wife at Alaka on Mount Kailāsa in the Himālaya mountains. The  accomplishes this by describing the many beautiful sights the cloud will see on its northward course to the city of Alakā, where his wife awaits his return.

In Sanskrit literature, the poetic conceit used in the Meghaduta spawned the genre of Sandesa Kavya or messenger poems, most of which are modeled on the Meghaduta (and are often written in the Meghadutas Mandākrāntā metre). Examples include the Hamsa-sandesha, in which Rama asks a Hansa Bird to carry a message to Sita, describing sights along the journey.

In 1813, the poem was first translated into English by Horace Hayman Wilson. Since then, it has been translated several times into various languages. As with the other major works of Sanskrit literature, the most famous traditional commentary on the poem is by Mallinātha.

The great scholar of Sanskrit literature, Arthur Berriedale Keith, wrote of this poem: "It is difficult to praise too highly either the brilliance of the description of the cloud’s progress or the pathos of the picture of the wife sorrowful and alone. Indian criticism has ranked it highest among Kalidasa’s poems for brevity of expression, richness of content, and power to elicit sentiment, and the praise is not undeserved."

An excerpt is quoted in Canadian director Deepa Mehta's film, Water.
The poem was also the inspiration for Gustav Holst's The Cloud Messenger Op. 30 (1909–10).

Simon Armitage appears to reference Meghaduta in his poem ‘Lockdown’.

It is believed the picturesque Ramtek near Nagpur inspired Kalidasa to write the poem.

Visualisation of Meghadūta
Meghadūta describes several scenes and is a rich source of inspiration for many artists.

An example are the drawings by Nana Joshi.

Composer Fred Momotenko wrote the composition 'Cloud-Messenger', music for a multimedia performance with recorder, dance, projected animation and electronics in surround audio. The world premiere was at Festival November Music, with Hans Tuerlings (choreography), Jasper Kuipers (animation), Jorge Isaac (blockflutes) and dancers Gilles Viandier and Daniela Lehmann.

Adaptations 
Indian filmmaker Debaki Bose adapted the play into a 1945 film titled Meghdoot.

See also
 Mandākrāntā metre
 Hamsa-Sandesha
 Sanskrit literature
 Sanskrit drama
 Sandesh Rasak
 Sandesa Kavya
Ashadh Ka Ek Din

Editions
 . 2nd ed 1843 Introduction, text with English verse translation, and assorted footnotes.
 . Kalidasae Meghaduta et Çringaratilaka: additum est glossariumMeghaduta ; et, Çringaratilaka Sanskrit text, with introduction and some critical notes in Latin.
  With Sanskrit text, English translation and more extensive notes separately.
  The Megha Dūta: Or, Cloud Messenger. A prose translation.
 . German translation.
 . Hayman's translation, with notes and translation accompanying the Sanskrit text.
  Exhaustive Notes on the Meghaduta: Comprising Various Readings, the Text with the Commentary of .... Text with Mallinātha's commentary Sanjīvanī. Separate sections for English translation, explanation of Sanskrit phrases, and other notes.
  Kalidasa's Meghaduta

Translations
The Meghadūta has been translated many times in many Indian languages.
 The Bengali poet Buddhadeva Bose translated Meghadūta into Bengali in 1957.
 Dr. Jogindranath Majumdar translated Meghaduta in Bengali keeping its original 'Mandakranta Metre' for the first time published in 1969
 Acharya Dharmanand Jamloki Translated Meghduta in Garhwali and was well known for his work.
 Moti BA translated Meghduta in Bhojpuri Language.
Many Nepali poets such as Jiwanath Updhyaya Adhikari, Shiva Kumar Pradhan, Biswa Raj Adhikari have translated Meghduta in Nepali language
 Mukhathala G.Arjunan translated Meghaduta in Malayalam keeping its original 'Mandakranta Metre'

References

External links
 Text
Meghaduta - Transliterated text at GRETIL
 Translations
Translation by Arthur W. Ryder at The Internet Sacred Text Archive
Translation by C. John Holcombe (Available as ebook)
Partial text of the Megadhuta, with word-for-word translation
Illustrated translation by Jaffor Ullah and Joanna Kirkpatrick
A literal prose translation Translating Kalidasa with examples from Meghaduta.
Megadhuta in Garhwali Translation by Acharya Dharmanand Jamloki.
Recordings
Dr. Bipin Kumar Jha. Chanted recitation.
Sung to music composed by Vishwa Mohan Bhatt. (Also here)
Recitation of first verse by Sangeeta Gundecha. (Two other verses, 1.5 and 2.26, are recited from minute 5:50 onwards.)
 About the work
Illustrating the Meghaduta: "Illustrated catalogue of the plants and trees of Kalidasa’s Meghaduta".
A summary by Chandra Holm
Notes on issues in translation by Holcombe
A Review of a book of translation.

Works by Kalidasa
Sanskrit poetry
History of Nagpur
Poems adapted into films
Ancient Indian poems